Reginald Purdell (4 November 1896 – 22 April 1953) was an English actor and screenwriter who appeared in over 40 films between 1930 and 1951. During the same period he also contributed to the screenplays of 15 feature films, such as The Dark Tower, and had a brief foray into directing with two films in 1937.

Early life
Purdell was born in Clapham, London, the son of Charles William Grasdorff by his marriage to Mary Ann Piddill. At the 1881 census a few weeks after the marriage the couple was living in Monmouthshire and his father stated his name as Carl H. W. Grasdorff, giving his place of birth as Germany, about 1844, while his mother gave hers as Cardiff, about 1857. Grasdorff was naturalized as a British subject under the name of Carl Hermann Wilhelm Grasdorff. Mary Ann Grasdorff's maiden name of Piddill, suitably improved, later provided their son's stage name.

In 1892, Grasdorff was listed as "Grasdorff, Carl H. W., Newport, Monmouthshire, and Bute Docks, Cardiff, Sailing and Steamship Broker, Coal Exporter, and Managing Steamship Owner".

Both parents were living in Clapham in 1901.

Career
As a young man, under the name of Reginald Grasdorff, he served in the British Army with the South Wales Borderers regiment for the duration of the First World War. On returning to civilian life after the war, he decided to try his luck as an actor under the name of Purdell and gained experience on the stage through the 1920s. His move into films in 1930 coincided with the advent of the talkie era in British cinema.

Purdell's first screen appearance was in the 1930 comedy The Middle Watch, in a role he would later reprise in a 1940 remake. He next travelled to Germany to feature in historical drama Congress Dances, an ambitious and lavishly budgeted project by the UFA film company, involving the simultaneous filming of three versions of the same story in German, English and French in an attempt to prove that a European company could challenge the dominance of American studios in the new era of sound by delivering a continent-wide hit.

Purdell soon began to accumulate screen credits in a wide variety of films ranging from cheaply made quota quickies to more sophisticated productions. He showed a knack for playing comedy, and his 1930s films fell mainly into this genre, with occasional ventures into straight drama and thrillers. Purdell's screenwriting career began in 1932 and he was most productive in this field during the late 1930s, with only occasional ventures later in his career. He tried his hand at film directing in 1937 with two comedies Don't Get Me Wrong, a Max Miller vehicle co-directed with Arthur B. Woods, and Patricia Gets Her Man. Both films were reasonably well-received, but Purdell appears to have decided that directing was not for him, as there would be no more ventures in this area.

In the 1940s Purdell's acting career diversified, with fewer throwaway comedies and more appearances in high-quality dramatic vehicles. His credits included war dramas We Dive at Dawn and Two Thousand Women, Gainsborough melodrama Love Story, notorious box-office flop musical London Town and the classic Brighton Rock. Purdell's last screen appearance was in 1951.

Personal life
In the summer of 1928, under his real name of Reginald William Henry Grasdorff, Purdell married May Watson at Wandsworth. They had a son in 1932, born in Kensington and registered under the name of John R. W. Grasdorff.

Purdell died on 22 April 1953, at Kensington, London. His death was registered under the name of Reginald Purdell and his age stated as 57.

Partial filmography

 The Middle Watch (1930) - Cpl. Duckett
 A Night in Montmartre (1931) - Tino
 A Night Like This (1932) - Waiter (uncredited)
 Congress Dances (1932) - Pepi
 My Lucky Star (1933) - Artist
 Crime on the Hill (1933) - Reporter
 Up to the Neck (1933) - Jimmy Catlin
 Three Men in a Boat (1933)
 On the Air (1934) - Reggie
 The Queen's Affair (1934) - Soldier
 The Luck of a Sailor (1934) - Jenkins
 What's in a Name? (1934) - Harry Stubbs
 The Old Curiosity Shop (1934) - Dick Swiveller
 Key to Harmony (1935) - Tom Kirkwood
 Royal Cavalcade (1935) - Radio Listener
 Get Off My Foot (1935) - Joe
 Debt of Honour (1936) - Pedro Salvas
 Where's Sally? (1936) - Dick Burgess
 Crown v. Stevens (1936) - Alf
 Hail and Farewell (1936) - Nobby
 Side Street Angel (1937) - McGill
 Ship's Concert (1937, Short) - Reggie
 The Dark Stairway (1938) - Askew
 Quiet Please (1938) - Algy Beresford
 The Viper (1938) - Announcer
 Simply Terrific (1938) - Sam Todd
 Many Tanks Mr. Atkins (1938) - Pvt. Nuts Nutter
 It's in the Blood (1938)
 Q Planes (1939) - Pilot (uncredited)
 His Brother's Keeper (1940) - Bunny Reeves
 Pack Up Your Troubles (1940) - Tommy Perkins
 The Middle Watch (1940) - Cpl Duckett
 Busman's Honeymoon (1940) - MacBride
 Fingers (1941) - Creeper
 We Dive at Dawn (1943) - Coxwain - C / P.O. Dabbs
 Variety Jubilee (1943) - Joe Swan
 It's in the Bag (1944) - Joe
 Bell-Bottom George (1944) - Birdie Edwards
 Love Story (1944) - Albert
 Two Thousand Women (1944) - Alec Harvey
 Candles at Nine (1944) - Charles Lacey
 Dreaming (1944)
 London Town (1946) - Stage Manager
 The Root of All Evil (1947) - Perkins
 Holiday Camp (1947) - Redcoat
 Captain Boycott (1947) - American reporter
 A Man About the House (1947) - Higgs
 Brighton Rock (1948) - Frank
 Stage Fright (1950) - Police Car Driver (uncredited)
 Files from Scotland Yard (1951) - Inspector Gower

References

External links
Reginald Purdell at BFI Film & TV Database

1896 births
1953 deaths
English male film actors
English film directors
English male screenwriters
Male actors from London
People from Clapham
British Army personnel of World War I
20th-century English male actors
20th-century English screenwriters
20th-century English male writers